Gabriela Chibana (born 7 August 1993) is a Brazilian judoka.

She is the silver medallist of the 2019 Judo Grand Slam Brasilia in the -48 kg category.

She represented Brazil at the 2020 Summer Olympics. She competed in the women's 48 kg event.

References

External links

 

1993 births
Living people
Brazilian female judoka
Judoka at the 2020 Summer Olympics
Olympic judoka of Brazil
Sportspeople from São Paulo
20th-century Brazilian women
21st-century Brazilian women